Gemmula closterion is a species of sea snail, a marine gastropod mollusk in the family Turridae, the turrids.

Description
The length of the shell attains 17.8 mm.

Distribution
This marine species occurs off Tanimbar Island, Indonesia.

References

 Sysoev, A. V. (1997). Mollusca Gastropoda: New deep-water turrid gastropods (Conoidea) from eastern Indonesia. in: Crosnier, A. et al. (Ed.) Résultats des Campagnes MUSORSTOM 16. Campagne Franco-Indonésienne KARUBAR. Mémoires du Muséum national d'Histoire naturelle. Série A, Zoologie. 172: 325-356

External links
 MNHN, Paris: specimen
  Tucker, J.K. 2004 Catalog of recent and fossil turrids (Mollusca: Gastropoda). Zootaxa 682:1-1295.

closterion
Gastropods described in 1997